Papilio iswara, the great Helen, is a species of large swallowtail butterfly found in parts of Southeast Asia.

Status
Papilio iswara is not uncommon and not threatened.

Subspecies
Papilio iswara iswara (southern Burma to Singapore, Sumatra, Bangka)
Papilio iswara araspes C. & R. Felder, 1859 (northern Borneo, Natuna Island)

Taxonomy
Papilio iswara is a member of the helenus species group. The members of this clade are:
Papilio helenus Linnaeus, 1758
Papilio iswara White, 1842
Papilio iswaroides Fruhstorfer, 1898
Papilio nephelus Boisduval, 1836
Papilio nubilus Staudinger, 1895
Papilio sataspes C. & R. Felder, 1865

Type material
The holotype is conserved in the Natural History Museum, London.

References

White, A., 1842, Notice of two New Species of Papilio from Penang, presented to the British Museum by Sir. Wm. Norris. Entomologist 1:280.

External links
Butterflies in Indo-China

iswara
Butterflies described in 1842
Butterflies of Singapore
Butterflies of Borneo
Butterflies of Indochina